Clift may refer to:

Surname:
Bill Clift (1762–1840), British jockey
Charmian Clift (1923–1969), Australian writer and essayist during the mid 20th century
David Horace Clift (1907–1972), American librarian, chief executive of the American Library Association
Denison Clift (1885–1961), American screenwriter and film director
Eleanor Clift (born 1940), liberal political reporter, television pundit, author
Harlond Clift (1912–1992), third baseman for the St. Louis Browns and Washington Senators
Jack Clift (born 1955), American Composer and Music Producer
James A. Clift (1857–1923), lawyer, insurance agent and political figure in Newfoundland
James Shannon Clift (1814–1873), English-born merchant and political figure in Newfoundland
Jean Dalby Clift an Episcopal priest and pastoral counsellor
Joseph W. Clift (1837–1908), U.S. Representative from Georgia
Ken Clift DCM (1916–2009), Australian recipient of the Distinguished Conduct Medal
Malcolm Clift, Australian former professional rugby league footballer and coach
Montgomery Clift (1920–1966), American film and stage actor
Paddy Clift (1953–1996), Zimbabwean educated first class cricketer
Pat Studdy-Clift, Australian author specializing in historical fiction and non-fiction
Peter Clift, British marine geologist and geophysicist
Robert Clift (born 1962), former field hockey player
Robert Clift, Jr. (1824–1859), an American soldier and early settler in California
Roland Clift, CBE, chemical engineering professor
Wallace Clift (born 1926), author, professor emeritus at the University of Denver
William Clift, (1775–1849), British naturalist

Given name:
Clift Andrus (1890–1968), United States Army Major General
Clift Chandler (1887–1967), American politician from Tennessee
George Clift King (1848–1935), the second mayor of the town of Calgary, Alberta
Scott Edward Clift James Levy (born 1964), American professional wrestler known by his ring name Raven
Clift Schimmels (died 2001), American football coach and Baptist speaker and educator

Buildings:
Clift (hotel), luxury hotel in San Francisco, California
Rock Clift, or High Banks, a historic home at Matthews, Talbot County, Maryland, United States

See also
Clifftop (disambiguation)
Clifton (disambiguation)
Lift (disambiguation)

English-language surnames